Uylenburgh is a surname. Notable people with the surname include:

Gerrit van Uylenburgh (1625–1679), or Gerrit Uylenburgh, Dutch art-dealer
Hendrick van Uylenburg (1587–1661), Dutch Golden Age art dealer
Rombertus van Uylenburgh (1554–1624), best known as father of Saskia van Uylenburgh, wife of Rembrandt
Saskia van Uylenburg (1612–1642), wife of the Dutch painter Rembrandt van Rijn